A map is a symbolic visual representation of an area.

Map or MAP may also refer to:

Arts and entertainment
 Map (band), an indie band from California, US
 Map (painting), a 1961 oil-on-canvas painting by Jasper Johns
 Map (video games), also known as a level, area, or world
 Map, a character in Dora the Explorer
 "Map", song by Adam Lambert from the album Trespassing
 "Map", song by The Microphones from the album The Glow Pt. 2

Organizations
 MAP Linhas Aéreas, a Brazilian airline
 HM Melbourne Assessment Prison, a prison in Australia
 Maghreb Arabe Press, the official Moroccan news agency
 Malaysian Advancement Party, a political party in Malaysia
 Media Access Project, a communications policy law firm and advocacy organization
 Medical Aid for Palestinians, a UK charity
 Minister of Aircraft Production, a WWII-era UK ministry, later replaced by the Ministry of Supply
 Mobile Assault Platoon, a platoon in the US Marine Corps
 Motorcycle Awareness Program, a motorists' safety training program
 Motorsport Association of Pakistan
 Municipal Alliance for Peace, a network to promote peace in the Middle East
 Museo de Arte de Ponce, an art museum in Puerto Rico
 Museo de Arte Precolombino (Peru), a Peruvian art museum
 Muslim Association Party, a political party in the Gold Coast (now Ghana)

Science and technology

Computing
 MAP (file format)
 Manufacturing Automation Protocol, a set of computer network communication protocols
 Mapping of Address and Port, an IPv6 transition technology
 Mean average precision, in information retrieval
 Message Access Profile, a Bluetooth profile for exchange of messages between devices
 Mobile Application Part, a mobile phone network protocol

Programming
 Map (computer science), or associative array, a data type composed of a collection of key/value pairs
 Associative containers, an implementation in the C++ language
 Map (higher-order function), used to apply a function to a list of values and return another list with the results
 Map (parallel pattern), an idiom in parallel computing

Mathematics
 Map (mathematics), generalizations of the concept of function
 Map (graph theory), a drawing of a graph on a surface without overlapping edges
 Planar graph, a graph drawn on a planar surface
 Maps of manifolds
 Combinatorial map, a representation of a topological subdivision of the plane
 Functional predicate, in formal logic
 Maximum a posteriori estimation, in statistics
 Markov additive process, in applied probability
 Markovian arrival process, in queueing theory
 another term for a function, often with some sort of special structure
 another term for a morphism in category theory
 a subdivision of the plane or other surface into regions; see Four color theorem

Medicine and biology
 Map (butterfly), a butterfly of the family Nymphalidae
 Mean arterial pressure, the driving force of blood flow
 Mean airway pressure, in mechanical ventilation
 Methionyl aminopeptidase, an enzyme
 Microtubule-associated protein, a member of proteins that interact with the microtubules of the cellular cytoskeleton
 Mitogen-activated protein, a mediator of intracellular signaling
 Mussel adhesive protein
 Mycobacterium avium subspecies paratuberculosis, a strain of pathogenic bacteria
 6α-Methyl-17α-acetoxyprogesterone or medroxyprogesterone acetate

Others
 Cognitive map, commonly referred to simply as "map", mental representations of physical locations
 Malaria Atlas Project, a non-profit data dissemination project
 Manifold absolute pressure, in an internal combustion engine
 Microwave Anisotropy Probe, an unmanned space mission
 Missed approach point, in aviation
 Mission Augmentation Port, a proposed standard for unmanned spacecraft docking for On-orbit satellite servicing and mission augmentation
 Modified atmosphere packaging, a food packaging technique
 Monoammonium phosphate, an ammonium compound and fertiliser

Other uses
 MAP test, a testing regimen for the flushing power of toilets
 Austronesian languages (ISO 639 alpha-3 code: map)
 Managerial assessment of proficiency, a methodology used in human resources
 Membership action plan, for countries joining NATO
 Minimum advertised price
 Missouri Assessment Program, an annual set of mandatory standardized tests taken by students in Missouri, US
 Walter Map (1140–1210), writer

See also
 Maps (disambiguation)
 Mapp (disambiguation)
 Mappy (disambiguation)
 Mapping (disambiguation)
 Maap, an island in the Federated States of Micronesia